The fourteenth edition of the South American Championship of football was held in Buenos Aires, Argentina from 27 December 1936 to 1 February 1937.

The participating countries were Argentina, Brazil, Chile, Paraguay, Peru, and Uruguay thus making this the first edition in which more than five teams took part of the event.

Bolivia, and Colombia (a new CONMEBOL member) withdrew from the tournament.

Squads
For a complete list of participants squads see: 1937 South American Championship squads

Venues

Final round
Each team played against each of the other teams. Two points were awarded for a win, one point for a draw and zero points for a defeat.

As Brazil and Argentina finished tied in points, a playoff was required to determine the champion.

Play-off

Result

Goal scorers

7 goals
  Raúl Toro
5 goals

  Alberto Zozaya
  Severino Varela

4 goals

  Luisinho
  Patesko

3 goals

  Francisco Varallo
  Carvalho Leite
  Juan Píriz

2 goals

  Vicente de la Mata
  Enrique García
  Alejandro Scopelli
  Niginho
  Roberto
  Aurelio González
  Amadeo Ortega
  Teodoro Fernández
  Jorge Alcalde

1 goal

  Afonsinho
  Bahia
  Manuel Arancibia
  José Avendaño
  Arturo Carmona
  Guillermo Riveros
  Guillermo Torres
  Juan Amarilla
  Adolfo Erico
  Martín Flor
  Raúl Núñez Velloso
  Alejandro Villanueva
  Adolfo Magallanes
  Jose Maria Lavalle
  Adelaido Camaiti
  Eduardo Ithurbide
  Segundo Villadóniga

References

External links

 South American Championship 1937 at RSSSF

 
1937
1937
1937 in South American football
1937 in Argentine football
1937 in Brazilian football
1937 in Uruguayan football
1937 in Paraguayan football
1937 in Peruvian football
1937 in Chilean sport
1937
1936 in South American football
December 1936 sports events
January 1937 sports events
February 1937 sports events
1937
1930s in Buenos Aires